Diyodar railway station is a railway station in Banaskantha district, Gujarat, India on the Western line of the Western Railway network. It serves Diyodar town. Its station code is 'DEOR'. Passenger, Express, and Superfast trains halt here.

Nearby stations

Mitha is the nearest railway station towards , whereas Dhanakwada is the nearest railway station towards .

Trains

The following Express and Superfast trains halt at Diyodar railway station in both directions:

 19151/52 Palanpur–Bhuj Intercity Express
 14321/22 Ala Hazrat Express (via Bhildi)
 12959/60 Dadar–Bhuj Superfast Express

References 

Railway stations in Banaskantha district
Ahmedabad railway division